TNA Epics is a professional wrestling television program for Total Nonstop Action Wrestling that aired on Spike in the United States and Bravo in the United Kingdom.> The show was hosted by Mick Foley and showed matches and events from the history much like WWE Vintage. In December 2009, Dixie Carter announced in an interview that Epics would be debuting on Spike in January 2010. The second season began on Thursday, January 14, 2010.

The series was later released in full on Impact Wrestling's Impact Plus streaming service.

History

Beginning on Bravo (2009)
TNA Epics originally aired on Bravo in the United Kingdom before being broadcast in the United States. The show was announced on May 8, 2009, as a chance for UK TNA fans to see classic TNA matches and events for the first time since TNA signed with Bravo and Classic TNA shows ceased being shown on The Wrestling Channel. On June 26, 2009, the air time of TNA Epics on Bravo was moved from Fridays at 10pm GMT to Saturdays at 11pm, meaning that TNA Epics would now be shown following the UK showing of TNA Impact! Epics disappeared from television in the UK when the July 11, 2009, episode which was set to feature "The Best of Jeff Hardy in TNA" was taken off the television listings before being set to air. The status of the show remained unknown until it was announced to be cancelled on August 2, 2009, less than three months from its inception. However, the developed episodes are still available on television in Germany, Austria and Switzerland. However, Bravo showed replays of the episodes of TNA Epics at a new time of Saturdays at 8pm, before the TNA Impact! broadcasts, and on September 26, 2009, the previously unaired episode "X-Division Insanity, Part 1" was shown.

TNA Epics on Spike (2010)
On December 3, 2009, TNAWrestling.com posted a video interview with TNA president Dixie Carter. She announced that a "new show", TNA Epics would debut on Spike. It was later revealed that the show would begin on January 14, 2010, and air on one Thursday per month. On February 19, 2010, it was announced that the March 18th edition of TNA Epics, featuring the X-Division was dropped from Spike's schedule. But, the show was later announced to be moved to Monday Nights following iMPACT! with the dropped episode being aired on Spike following TNA iMPACT! on March 15. However, the episode was once again moved to the following night, Tuesday March 16. Since April 2010, the current status of the show is unknown and no further episodes have been announced.

TNA Epics on Extreme Sports Channel (2010)
On Friday November 19, 2010, TNA Epics began re-airing on Extreme Sports Channel in the UK. At this time Extreme was already home to TNA's Monthly Pay-Per Views and weekly syndicated show Xplosion. Epics aired back to back double episodes every Friday night on Extreme Sports Channel, following TNA Xplosion at 10pm and 11pm. The show's run on Extreme ended on December 31, 2010, when TNA's contract with Extreme Sports ended and all TNA programming moved to Challenge.

Streaming services (2016)
In September 19, 2016, Impact Wrestling began airing and releasing previously aired and unaired episodes of TNA Epics on the Impact Plus and Pluto TV streaming services. The series has produced 20 episodes with 7 episodes that were previously unaired until the 2016 release on the promotions streaming service.

Episode list

Season 1 (2009)

Season 2 (2010)

See also 

 Total Nonstop Action Wrestling (TV Series)

References

External links

2009 British television series debuts
2010 British television series endings
Spike (TV network) original programming
Impact Wrestling television shows
2009 in professional wrestling
2010 in professional wrestling